The 2014 Florida Commissioner of Agriculture election took place on November 4, 2014, to elect the Florida Commissioner of Agriculture. Incumbent Republican Commissioner of Agriculture Adam Putnam was re-elected to a second term in office.

Republican primary

Candidates

Declared
 Adam Putnam, incumbent Agriculture Commissioner

Democratic primary

Candidates

Declared
 Thad Hamilton, Broward County Soil and Water Conservation District supervisor and Independent candidate for Commissioner of Agriculture in 2010

General election

Candidates
 Adam Putnam (Republican)
 Thad Hamilton (Democratic)
 Jeffrey M. Obos (Write-in)

Endorsements

Polling

See also
 Florida Commissioner of Agriculture

References

External links
Adam Putnam for Commissioner of Agriculture
Thad Hamilton for Commissioner of Agriculture (archived)

Commissioner of Agriculture
Florida Commissioner of Agriculture
Florida Commissioner of Agriculture elections